Shri Krishna Singh (Sinha) (21 October 1887 – 31 January 1961), also known as Shri Babu, was the first chief minister of the Indian state of Bihar (1946–61). Except for the period of World War II, Sinha was the chief minister of Bihar from the time of the first Congress Ministry in 1937 until his death in 1961.  Along with the Desh Ratna Rajendra Prasad and Bihar Vibhuti Anugrah Narayan Sinha (A.N. Sinha), Sinha is regarded among the 'Architects of Modern Bihar'. He also led the Dalit entry into the Baidyanath Dham temple (Vaidyanath Temple, Deoghar), which reflected his commitment towards the upliftment and social empowerment of the Dalits. He was the first chief minister in the country to abolish the zamindari system. He underwent different terms of imprisonment for a total of about eight years in British India. Sinha's mass meetings brought hordes of people to hear him. He was known as Bihar Kesari for his lionlike roars when he rose to address the masses. His close friend and eminent Gandhian Bihar Vibhuti A.N. Sinha in his essay Mere Shri Babu wrote that, "Since 1921, the History of Bihar has been the history of the life of Shri Babu".

The former President of India, Pratibha Patil, released a book on the letters of exchange between Sinha and prime minister Jawaharlal Nehru titled Freedom and Beyond. The correspondence between Nehru and Sinha touches on subjects such as Indian democracy in the making in early years of Independence, Centre-State relations, role of governor, turbulence in Nepal, zamindari abolition and education scenario. Sinha was known for his scholarship and polymathy and he had given his personal collection of 17,000 books to the public library in Munger in 1959 which is now named after him as Sri Krishna Seva Shadan.

Early life and family
Shri Krishna Sinha was born in a Bhumihar Brahmin family on 21 October 1887 in the village of Maur, Barbigha in the Munger district of Bengal Presidency (now part of Sheikhpura district). His mother, who was also an unassuming and religious-minded person, died of plague when he was five years old. He was educated in the village school and at Zila School in Munger. In 1906 he joined Patna College, which was then an affiliate of the University of Calcutta. He obtained a master's degree from the University of Calcutta and then doctorate of law from Patna University and started practicing in Munger from 1915. In the meantime, he married and had two sons, Shivshankar and Bandishankar (more commonly known as Swaraj Babu) who later held various posts in the state government.

Independence movement
Shri Krishna Sinha first met Mahatma Gandhi in 1916 at Central Hindu College, Benares and later at Shah Muhammad Jubair's house in December 1920. At Munger, he vowed to work relentlessly to free India from the British rule. He gave up practising law in 1921 to take part in Gandhi's non-cooperation movement.

He was arrested for the first time in 1922 at Jubair's house and Congress Seva Dal was declared illegal. For this he was known as Bihar Kesari by the people. He was released from jail in 1923 and on the day of Tulsi Jayanti performed in the play Bharat Darshan at Central School, Kharagpur. In the same year he became member of the All India Congress Committee.

In 1927, Sinha became member of the Legislative Council and in 1929 became General Secretary of the Bihar Pradesh Congress Committee (BPCC). In 1930, he played an important role in the Namak Satyagrah at Garhpura. He suffered severe scalding injuries to his hands and chest while being arrested, was imprisoned for six months and then was again arrested and imprisoned for two years during the civil disobedience movement. He was released after the Gandhi–Irwin Pact and again started with his nationalist work and work with the Kisan Sabha. On 9 January 1932 he was sentenced to two years of rigorous imprisonment and a fine of Rs. 1,000. He was released from Hazaribagh Jail in October 1933. He was involved in relief and rehabilitation after the 1934 Nepal–Bihar earthquake. He was the President of Munger Zila Parishad from 1934 to 1937. In 1935, he became member of the Bihar Legislative Assembly.

Sinha was also the President of the BPCC in 1936 with A.N. Sinha as his deputy, a member of its working committee and in fact, Sinha and A.N. Sinha were the life and soul of the Provincial Working Committee and of the Congress organisation in the state for over thirty years. This long period of service at the help of the state is a proof not only of the great popularity and confidence which he enjoyed in the party but it symbolises also his great qualities as a co-ordinator between party and government.
 
On 20 July 1937, he became the Premier of Bihar province when Congress came to power. Under the Government of India Act of 1935, Sinha formed his Cabinet at Patna on 20 July 1937. He and his colleague A.N. Sinha disagreed with the governor on the issue of the release of political prisoners and resigned. The then-governor had to accede to the demands for release of prisoners from Cellular Jail (Kalapani) and Bihar Tenancy Act was reformed in favour of peasants. They then resumed office. But they again resigned in 1939, as did all Congress chief ministers, over the question of involving India in the Second World War without the consent of the Indian people. Along with A.N. Sinha,the first deputy chief minister cum finance minister of Bihar, he is considered one of the makers of modern Bihar.

Sinha was always interested in self-study and his ideas and speeches were noted for their wisdom. He was a staunch opponent of castes and defended the oppressed. Impressed by his courage, in 1940 Gandhi described him as "the first Satyagrahi" of Bihar while A.N. Sinha was the second. He was jailed for nine months (22 November 1940 – 26 August 1941). When the Quit India movement started in 1942, he was arrested on 10 August. He was released in 1944 from Hazaribagh jail after he became seriously ill. In the same year his wife died at Prince of Wales Medical College.

As the former chief minister of Bihar he attended the Simla Conference and also became the member of Constituent Assembly of India which framed the Constitution of India.

Sinha served Bihar continuously from 1946 until his death on 31 January 1961 at the age of 73. In 1978, the Ministry of Culture established a science museum called Srikrishna Science Centre. The biggest conference hall in Patna, Shri Krishna Memorial Hall is also named after him.

Political Legacy

 
Almost all the development projects in Bihar during this period involved the leadership pair of Sinha and A.N. Sinha. It includes several river valley projects right from Koshi, Aghaur and Sakri to other such river projects. The first five-year plan period was given to the development in rural development works mainly in the agricultural sector. Bihar became the top state in the country's first five-year plan. From the second five-year plan period, Sinha brought several heavy industries like Barauni Refinery, Heavy Engineering Corporation at Ranchi, Bokaro Steel Plant, Barauni Fertiliser Plant, Barauni Thermal Power Station, Damodar Valley Corporation, Patratu Thermal Power Station, Scooter Factory in Fatuha, Pyrite Phosphate Chemical Limited and Sulphur mines at Amjhaur, Sindri Fertiliser Plant, Kargali Coal Washery, Garhara locomotive shed. He wanted to build an industrial corridor from Begusarai-Bakhtiyarpur-Fatuha, so he constructed the first rail-road bridge on river Ganga in independent India, The Rajendra Setu in Mokama,in 1959.
 
Arun Kumar says Sinha made an immense contribution in the cultural and social development of the state. He established the Rajendra Chatra Niwas at Calcutta for Bihari students, the Anugraha Narayan Sinha Institute of Social Studies (ANSISS) at Patna, Netarhat school at Ranchi, Engineering college at Muzaffarpur, Bhagalpur, Jamshedpur, Sindri, Gaya, Motihari, Lok Rangshala of the Bihar Bhartiya Nritya Kala Mandir, Sanskrit College at Patna, Rabindra Parishad at Patna, the statue of Buddha at Rajgir Venu Van Vihar, as well as an orphanage at Muzaffarpur were opened by him.
The then prime minister of India Jawaharlal Nehru sent Paul H. Appleby to assess the administration in states and in his famous report, he described Bihar as the best governed state in India due to the under excellent leadership of the pair of Sinha and A.N. Sinha.

In a formal legal sense, the chief minister can be persuaded or forced in the interim to resign or retire by the legislature to which the Council of Ministers is collectively responsible. Sinha successfully defied a motion of no-confidence on five occasions.

Sinha maintained good working relations with the secretariat officials and protected police from demoralization because police, having done away with pre-independence legacy no longer symbolised tyranny, domination, intimidation and oppression. He emphasised that in democratic India, policemen symbolised efficiency, service, protection, and help to the people. Caste played no role in promotion, transfer, posting and in working relationship of police officials with ministers or the chief minister in the fifties. S.Q. Rizvi, a retired senior Indian Police Service official, said, "About the qualities of head and heart of this great man, it could be summed up in three words 'Humanism, Integrity and Secularism'. Dr. Shri Krishna Sinha was a great leader and a great idealist endowed with great intellectual attainments. But what to me appeared the most prominent feature was that as a politician he had absolute integrity. A rare quality in a political leader of an area besieged with problems of caste and of low level mental make-up."
 
Sinha was a progressive leader who introduced substantive land reform legislations at the early period of Bihar's history. He favoured the growth of agricultural capitalism and he wanted to do away with the constraints and hindrances in the way of the growth of productive forces in agriculture, but some critics thought he was less enthusiastic about post-zamindari agrarian reforms. Yet, leftists grant credit to Sinha for getting the Bihar Tenancy Act passed in the early years.

Justice V. R. Krishna Iyer said that Sinha was among those who were "heavyweights in their own right and brought into political administration a texture of nationalism, federalism, realism, and even some touch of pragmatic socialism", and that he "lived poor, died poor and identified himself with the poor."

The present Chief Minister of Bihar, Nitish Kumar, while observing Sri Babu's 124th Birth Anniversary in 2011, also attended by Sushil Modi, Jagannath Mishra, Ramashray Prasad Singh, Mahachandra Prasad Singh and others said, "Mr. Sinha's contributions, as the first Chief Minister of Bihar, cannot be over-stated. He was the first one to sow the seeds of progress in the state by taking series of agricultural and industrial initiative in the Bihar state but it was unfortunate that successive governments after his tenure could not capitalize on it and wasted the opportunity that landed the state in dire economic agricultural and social state and both of Sri Krishna Sinha and Anugrah Narayan Singh administrative skills are yet to be matched."

Indian National Congress Resolution on conferring Bharat Ratna to Sri Babu

A unanimous resolution was also adopted to confer Bharat Ratna to Bihar Kesari Sri Babu at Sadaqat Ashram, the Congress headquarters in Patna attended by veteran party leaders like former Lok Sabha Speaker Meira Kumar, former Kerala & Nagaland Governor Nikhil Kumar, former union minister of state Shakeel Ahmad, former union minister of state K.K.Tiwary, Congress legislature party leader in the state assembly & former Speaker Sadanand Singh, and National Media Panelist Prem Chandra Mishra , and the AICC general secretary and in charge of Bihar, C. P. Joshi, among others who spoke on Shri Babu's profile and his contributions to social and economic development of the state of Bihar. They, in their turn, recalled several state and national leaders of the party cutting across religion and castes established and promoted by Sinha based on their merit.

Bharatiya Janata Party on Sri Babu
The Bharatiya Janata Party also organised a function to celebrate the birth anniversary of Sri Babu. The BJP functionaries who addressed the function included Rajya Sabha member and senior BJP leader C. P. Thakur, leader of opposition in the state assembly Prem Kumar and former Union minister Sanjay Paswan. The party's senior functionaries on Sunday hailed the state's first CM, Sinha, a Congress man, as the tallest leader who achieved all-round development of the state under his rule.

On the 127th Birth Anniversary of Sinha in 2014, the present minister of communication (independent charge) and minister of state for railways in prime minister Narendra Modi's Cabinet, Shri Manoj Sinha praised Sinha for being a practitioner of good governance from the day he took over the reins of the state. He said, "Today everybody in the country and the world over has been talking about good governance. Sri Babu was its 'pratimoorti (embodiment)'". The minister, who is a Member of Parliament from Ghazipur in UP, surprised the audience by saying that his elder uncle had been Sinha's private secretary for five years. He said, "Sri Babu, earlier, was influenced by Sri Aurobindo and Surendranath Banerjee, and pledged in the Ganga at Munger to dedicate his life to the service of the country, holding a copy of the Gita in one hand and a 'kripan' in another. Later, he came under the spell of Bal Gangadhar Tilak, and was considered a 'garam dal neta' like him. However, in 1916, he heard the speech of Mahatma Gandhi at Kamakhya. There he realized that this man alone could lead the struggle for country's independence. After that, he became his lifelong follower."

See also
 List of Chief Ministers of Bihar

References

External links
Sri Babu & Anugrah Babu
Bihar's first exemplary government:The Sri Babu-Anugrah Babu regime
Rajendra Prasad :Letters to Sri Babu &  Anugrah Babu
Shri Babu, Anugrah Babu & Rajendra Babu:Bihar's builders

1887 births
1961 deaths
Indian independence activists from Bihar
Indian National Congress politicians
Chief Ministers of Bihar
Finance Ministers of Bihar
Members of the Constituent Assembly of India
University of Calcutta alumni
Bihar district councillors
People from Munger district
People from Nawada district
Members of the Central Legislative Assembly of India
Bihar MLAs 1952–1957
Bihar MLAs 1957–1962
Chief ministers from Indian National Congress